"Dig" a song by American heavy metal band Mudvayne, released in 2000 as the band's debut single it appears on the band's debut studio album L.D. 50 (2000). A music video was released for the song on April 10, 2001, and it later won the first ever MTV2 Award. It is also one of the band's most well-known songs, being certified gold in the United States. A live version of the song taken from the Tattoo the Earth tour appears on the live album Tattoo the Earth: The First Crusade. The song also appeared on the compilation album WWF Tough Enough. The song has also spawned an Internet meme known as "Brbr Deng" (the onomatopoeia of the opening bass riff), which bassist Ryan Martinie has expressed some ambivalence about.

Music video
The music video for the song won the MTV2 Award in 2001 and was directed by Thomas Mignone. It was one of the first music videos to feature heavy metal artists in vibrant, brightly lit and color-saturated images, in sharp contrast to the dark, shadowy videos typical of the genre. The award was to honor the best overall achievement by an act whose video premiered on MTV2 and received significant on-air rotation. A special edition DVD single was released featuring nine different camera angles, allowing viewers to switch between the various bandmembers' performances filmed during the video's production. The DVD also included a behind the scenes featurette titled "Dig a Little Deeper".

Track listing
Promo single

Maxi single

Cassette single

Charts

Weekly

Year-end

Certifications

References

2000 debut singles
2000 songs
Mudvayne songs
Songs written by Chad Gray
Songs written by Ryan Martinie
Songs written by Matthew McDonough
Songs written by Greg Tribbett
Song recordings produced by Garth Richardson